Joseph Johnston may refer to:
Joseph Johnston (Irish politician) (1890–1972), Irish academic, farmer and politician
Allan Johnston (politician) (Joseph Allan Johnston, 1904–1974), Liberal party member of the Canadian House of Commons
Joseph C. Johnston (born 1938), American politician in the state of Iowa
Joseph E. Johnston (1807–1891), United States and Confederate Army general
Joseph F. Johnston (1843–1913), American governor of Alabama
Joseph Shackford Johnston, president of Virginia Wesleyan College
Joe Johnston (born 1950), American film director
Joe Johnston (rugby union) (born 1998), New Zealand rugby union player

See also
Joseph Johnson (disambiguation)